Mersim Asllani (born 7 June 1999) is a Kosovan professional footballer who plays as a midfielder for Swiss club Lausanne Ouchy and the Kosovo national team.

Club career

Lausanne Ouchy
On 13 August 2020, Asllani signed a three-year contract with Swiss Challenge League club Lausanne Ouchy. On 16 October 2020, Asllani was named as a Lausanne Ouchy substitute for the first time in a league match against Aarau. His debut with Lausanne Ouchy came eight days later in a 0–0 away draw against Wil after coming on as a substitute at 67th minute in place of Karim Gazzetta.

International career
From 2014, until 2019, Asllani was part of Switzerland at youth international level, respectively part of the U15, U16, U17, U18, U19, U20 and U21 teams and he with these teams played 42 matches and scored six goals. On 2 June 2021, he received an urgent call-up from Kosovo for the friendly matches against Guinea and Gambia. Six days later, Asllani made his debut with Kosovo in a friendly match against Guinea after coming on as a substitute at 62nd minute in place of Jetmir Topalli.

References

External links

Mersim Asllani at Switzerland U19
Mersim Asllani at Switzerland U20
Mersim Asllani at Switzerland U21

1999 births
Living people
People from Aigle
Kosovan footballers
Kosovo international footballers
Kosovan expatriate footballers
Kosovan expatriate sportspeople in Switzerland
Swiss men's footballers
Switzerland youth international footballers
Switzerland under-21 international footballers
Swiss people of Kosovan descent
Swiss people of Albanian descent
Association football midfielders
Swiss Super League players
FC Lausanne-Sport players
Grasshopper Club Zürich players
Swiss Challenge League players
FC Stade Lausanne Ouchy players
Sportspeople from the canton of Vaud